The Executive Council of Yukon, more commonly known as the Cabinet of Yukon, is the cabinet of the Canadian territory of Yukon. It is chosen by the Premier from the elected members of the governing party in the Yukon Legislative Assembly.

The current Executive Council is made up of members of the Yukon Liberal Party (Current as of January 2023).

References

 
Yukon
Politicians in Yukon
Lists of people from Yukon
Yukon politics-related lists